The Journey is the debut studio album by English boy band 911. Released in the United Kingdom through EMI on 24 February 1997, it peaked at number 13 on the UK Albums Chart and spent 17 weeks in the top 40. However, the album was extremely popular in Asia, where it topped the Malaysian Albums Chart and went 12× Platinum. It also reached number six in Taiwan. The Journey contains 911's signature song, "Bodyshakin'".

Critical reception
Peter Fawthorp of AllMusic said the following about the album; "It is amazing to think of all the education that could be learned if boy bands from around the world added some cultural flavor to their music. Instead of Irish tin whistles and accordions and Scottish bagpipes, we get the common denominator of '80s American/Euro synthesized pop music, albeit lifted by '90s production quality and slight traces of accents. None of this is to say that 911's The Journey is unengaging. They seem to be having as much fun as the American Backstreet Boys -- and for the record, have been around just as long. A pound of pretzels couldn't drown the taste of sugar that fizzes from The Journey, and while there is nothing original or spectacular to be found, the group deserves credit for packaging the album with as much glee as humanly possible. If you don't hum along to "Love Sensation" you're too stuffy. If you don't at least laugh with "Bodyshakin'", you're too hard. And if you mistake their version of "Rhythm of the Night" for the original (by DeBarge) and feel the need to dance... well, no one's looking."

Track listing

Credits and personnel
(Credits taken from AllMusic and The Journeys liner notes.)
 Chris Blair – mastering
 Lee Brennan – composer, vocalist
 Jimmy Constable – vocalist
 Spike Dawbarn – vocalist
 Goudie – composer
 Eliot Kennedy – composer, producer
 Tim Lever – producer
 John McLaughlin – composer
 Dana Meyers – composer
 Mike Percy – producer
 Shayne – composer
 Leon Sylvers III – composer
 Diane Warren – composer

Charts and certifications

Charts

Certifications

Release history

References

911 (English group) albums
EMI Records albums
Virgin Records albums
1997 debut albums